The Utah and the Civil War Monument is installed outside the Utah State Capitol in Salt Lake City, in the U.S. state of Utah.

References

External links

Monuments and memorials in Utah
Outdoor sculptures in Salt Lake City
Utah State Capitol